Dr. Pimple Popper is an American reality television series airing on TLC. The series, starring dermatologist and Internet celebrity Dr. Sandra Lee, follows her as she treats patients with unusual cases of facial and skin disorders at her clinic Skin Physicians & Surgeons in the Inland Empire city of Upland, California. The show started with an hour-long special on January 3, 2018 before the first season aired on July 11, 2018.

Initially airing at 10:00 p.m. Eastern Time on Wednesdays, Dr. Pimple Popper became the top-rated cable program in its time slot among women between ages 25–54. On August 14, the day before the final episode for Season 1 aired, TLC announced it had renewed the series for a second season, with new episodes set to air in January 2019. Another hour-long special was aired on December 13, 2018, before the second season began on January 3, 2019 with its episodes moved to 9 p.m. Eastern Time on Thursdays. Beginning part-way through the fifth season, new episodes became available on the Discovery+ streaming service, before returning to TLC for the sixth season. A spin-off series titled Dr. Pimple Popper: Before the Pop premiered on September 3, 2020.

The eighth season aired between July 13 and September 14, 2022. The ninth season will premiere on April 5, 2023.

Episodes

Season 1 (2018)

Season 2 (2019)

Season 3 (2019)

Season 4 (2019–20)

Season 5 (2020–21)

Season 6 (2021)

Season 7 (2022)

Season 8 (2022)

Season 9

Spin-offs

Before the Pop 
On August 5, 2020, it was announced that a spin-off series titled Dr. Pimple Popper: Before the Pop would premiere on September 3, 2020.

Webisodes

This Is Zit
Dr. Pimple Popper: This Is Zit is an online series available on TLC's website and Facebook. Each three- to six-minute episode focuses on a particular procedure done by Dr. Lee.

Season 1

Season 2

Season 3

Season 4

Season 5

Season 6

Season 7

Where Are They Now

Season 1

Season 2

Reception

Critical response
The first season of Dr. Pimple Popper has a Rotten Tomatoes rating of 78%. Kristen Baldwin of Entertainment Weekly gave the pilot episode a "B" rating, commenting that "Pimple Popper delivers that blast of feel-good warmth you want from a makeover show, as the patients offer tearful post-procedural testimonials about how Dr. Lee changed their life for the better."

Ratings

Season 1

Season 2

Season 3

Season 4

Before the Pop: Season 1

Season 5

Season 6

Season 7

Notes

References

External links
 
 

2010s American medical television series
2010s American reality television series
2018 American television series debuts
2020s American medical television series
2020s American reality television series
Dermatology
English-language television shows
Television shows filmed in California
Television shows set in California
TLC (TV network) original programming